Group 4 consisted of five of the 34 teams entered into the European zone: England, Hungary, Norway, Romania, and Switzerland. These five teams competed on a home-and-away basis for two of the 14 spots in the final tournament allocated to the European zone, with the group's winner and runner-up claiming those spots.

Standings

Results

Notes

External links 
Group 4 Detailed Results at RSSSF

4
1980–81 in English football
1981–82 in English football
1980–81 in Hungarian football
1981–82 in Hungarian football
1980 in Norwegian football
1981 in Norwegian football
1980–81 in Romanian football
1981–82 in Romanian football
1980–81 in Swiss football
1981–82 in Swiss football